Lusitano FC is a South African football (soccer) club based in Johannesburg that plays in the Vodacom League.
They won the Castle Cup in 1977

Former notable coaches
 Eddie Lewis
 Mario Tuani
 Joe Frickleton
 Budgie Byrne
 Frank Lord
 Fernando Mendes
 Walter Da Silva
 Oscar Gonzalez

Honours
1969 NFL Third Division Champions
1972 NFL Second Division league Champions
1977 NFL First Division Runners Up
1977 Castle Cup winners
1978 NPSL First Division league Champions
1982 NFL First Division Runners Up
2006 Southern Gauteng Second Division league Champions
2009 Gauteng Vodacom league Champions

See also
 National Football League (South Africa)

External links
Club Website
 1977 Team Photo

Association football clubs established in 1966
Soccer clubs in Johannesburg
SAFA Second Division clubs
Soccer clubs in Gauteng
National Football League (South Africa) clubs
1966 establishments in South Africa
Soccer and apartheid
Lusitano F.C. (South Africa)